Kokouna is a town in the Tansila Department of Banwa Province in western Burkina Faso. As of 2005 it had a population of 1,385.

References

Populated places in the Boucle du Mouhoun Region
Banwa Province